The Poplar by-election was a Parliamentary by-election held on 19 February 1914. The constituency returned one Member of Parliament (MP) to the House of Commons of the United Kingdom, elected by the first past the post voting system.

Vacancy
In February 1914, Sydney Buxton, the Liberal MP for Poplar since 1886,  resigned to take up an appointment as Governor-General of the Union of South Africa.

Electoral history

Candidates
Alfred William Yeo was selected as Liberal candidate. This followed reported splits and disagreements in the local Liberal party with some elements having supported Sir Victor Horsley, the scientist and surgeon, as potential candidate over Yeo. Yeo was an elected member of the Metropolitan Borough of Poplar. He served as a member of Poplar Board of Guardians, the body charged with administering the English Poor Laws. He also worked for ten years as Chairman of the Poplar Distress Committee, a body set up under the Unemployed Workmen Act of 1905 to provide grants to create jobs. In 1903–04, Yeo was elected Mayor of Poplar.
The local Labour Party considered contesting the election. They were considering adopting Harry Gosling, a former Liberal candidate as their prospective parliamentary candidate. However, they valued their relationship with the local Liberals; At the 1910 and 1913 London County Council elections, a Labour candidate and a Progressive (Liberal) candidate had run in harness against two Municipal Reform (Conservative) candidates, with success. Also the Liberals had withdrawn their candidate from neighbouring Bow & Bromley for the parliamentary elections in December 1910 and 1912, to assist Labour's George Lansbury. They would have been happier when the local Liberals selected Yeo rather than Horsley.
Robin Kerr-Clark stood for the Conservative Party.
The British Socialist Party, and its forerunner the Social Democratic Federation were opposed to Socialists making electoral pacts with Liberals. At the 1913 County Council elections they responded to Labour allowing the Progressives a free run in Bow & Bromley by fielding two of their own candidates instead. Though they polled well, the result of their intervention was to hand the seats to the Municipal Reform Party. The BSP adopted the same strategy for this by-election and chose Jack Jones to stand as their candidate. In the 1906 general election, Jones unsuccessfully stood for Camborne. In 1911, he became a trade union organiser, for the National Union of General Workers.

Campaign
The Unionist campaign was given a boost by the Conservative by-election victory in nearby Bethnal Green South West declared the day before polling day.

Result

Aftermath
A General Election was due to take place by the end of 1915. By the autumn of 1914, the following candidates had been adopted to contest that election. Due to the outbreak of war, the election never took place.
Liberal:Alfred William Yeo
Unionist:}

endorsed candidate of the Coalition Government.

References

 Craig, F. W. S. (1974). British parliamentary election results 1885-1918 (1 ed.). London: Macmillan.
 Wikipedia: en.wikipedia.org
 Who's Who: www.ukwhoswho.com
 Debrett's House of Commons 1916

Poplar by-election
Poplar,1914
Poplar by-election
Poplar by-election
Poplar,1914
Poplar, London